Epigynopteryx  africana is a moth of the  family Geometridae. It is found in Tanzania.

References

Endemic fauna of Tanzania
Ennominae
Insects of Tanzania
Moths of Africa